The 1942 Detroit Lions season was the franchise's 13th season in the National Football League. The Lions suffered the first winless season since Cincinnati went 0–8 in 1934.  This was the first NFL season during U.S. involvement in World War II, which led to player shortages, and thus a depletion of talent. The Lions were hit especially hard by the loss of star halfback Byron “Whizzer” White and tackle Tony Furst. Head coach Bill Edwards was sacked after three games, but the decision had no effect on the Lions’ fortunes.

While there were talks of suspending play, it was ultimately decided to allow all professional sports to continue as morale boosters on the home front.  It would remain the only winless season for the Lions until 2008.

Regular season

Schedule

Note: Intra-division opponents are in bold text.

Standings

Roster

Awards and records

 Most giveaways, single game: 12 (vs. Chicago Bears)

References

External links
Detroit Lions on Pro Football Reference
Detroit Lions on jt-sw.com
1942 Detroit Lions at The Football Database

Detroit Lions
Detroit Lions seasons
Detroit Lions
National Football League winless seasons